William J. Sanders is a vertebrate paleontologist and research scientist/preparator at the University of Michigan. He has written a number of papers on fossil elephants.

Education 
 Ph.D. Department of Anthropology, New York University. Dissertation Title: "Function, Allometry, and Evolution of the Australopithecine Lower Precaudal Spine." 1995.
 M.Phil. Department of Anthropology, New York University. 1990.
 B.A. Department of Anthropology, The University of Chicago. 1979.

References 

American paleontologists
Living people
University of Michigan staff
Year of birth missing (living people)